Altana is a German chemical company.

Altana may also refer to:

Places
 Alțâna, a village in Romania 
 Altana, Kuyavian-Pomeranian Voivodeship, a village in Poland

Fictional entities
 Altana, a figure in Final Fantasy XI

See also
 Atlanta